The Writers' Union of Romania, founded in March 1949, is a professional association of writers in Romania. It also has a subsidiary in Chișinău, Republic of Moldova. The Writers' Union of Romania was created by the communist regime by taking over the former Romanian Writers' Society (Societatea Scriitorilor Români), which had been established in 1908.

The Union organizes the annual Days and Nights of Literature Festival, and the awarding of the prestigious Ovid Prize for Literature.

Presidents
 Zaharia Stancu (active, 1949–1956)
 Mihail Sadoveanu (honorary, 1949–1956; active, 1956–1961) 
 Mihai Beniuc (1962–1964)
 Demostene Botez (1964–1966)
 Zaharia Stancu (1966–1974)
  (1974–1978)
 George Macovescu (1978–1982)
 Dumitru Radu Popescu (1982–1990)
 Mircea Dinescu (1990–1996)
  (1996–2000)
  (2000–2005)
 Nicolae Manolescu (2005–)

Tudor Arghezi was honorary president from 1962 to 1967, as was Victor Eftimiu in 1972; Ștefan Augustin Doinaș was chosen for this function in 1990 as well.

Notable members
Paul Cernat, essayist
Ioana Crăciunescu, poet and actress
Vasile Dîncu, Minister of National Defence
Eugenia Mihalea, poet
Aurel Pantea, poet
Nicolae Pogonaru, novelist
Sorin Lavric, writer (until 2020)

References

1949 establishments in Romania
Romania
Organizations established in 1949